Vinayaka Mission Medical College (popularly called as VMMC in Karaikal: French: Collège médical de la mission Vinayaka) is a medical college in Karaikal approved by the Medical Council of India, Government of Puducherry & India. This institution established medical college and hospitals in Karaikal in the year 1996.

Highlights
This college is situated in Keezhakasakudy , Karaikal. It has a 150-acre campus. It has well equipped laboratories, class rooms, museums  demonstration rooms and pre & paramedicals. Free medical services to poor patients. Has an experienced team of doctors.

References

Karaikal
Medical colleges in Puducherry